is the fastest train service running on the Tokaido & San'yō Shinkansen lines in Japan.

The trains stop at fewer stations than the Hikari and Kodama trains. The Nozomi service is not valid for foreigners traveling with a Japan Rail Pass.

Stopping patterns (as of May 2019)

Legend

Note:
1 Some trains begin/terminate at Nishi-Akashi, Himeji, Okayama or Hiroshima.
2 Some trains begin/terminate at Nagoya.

Only basic Nozomi stopping patterns are shown. Additional Nozomi trains with differing stopping patterns are added during holiday and high-peak travel periods, and are not included in this table.

Rolling stock

Current rolling stock
 N700 series (July 2007 – )
 N700S series (July 2020 – )

Former rolling stock
 300 series (March 1992 – March 2012)
 500 series (March 1997 – June 2008)
 700 series (March 1999 – March 2020)

Formations
Trains are formed as shown below, with car 1 at the Hakata end, and car 16 at the Tokyo end.

N700 series / N700S series

(All cars are completely non-smoking, except for enclosed smoking compartments located in cars 3, 7, 10, and 15)

700 series

History

Wartime steam services
The Nozomi name was first used for long-distance express services operated between Busan in Japanese-occupied Korea and Mukden (now Shenyang) in the former Manchukuo (now China) from 1934. From 1938, the services were extended to run between Busan and Hsinking (now Changchun) in Manchukuo. The services were run down between 1943 and 1944.

Shinkansen services
Nozomi shinkansen services commenced on March 14, 1992, using new 300 series trainsets with a top speed of 270 km/h. From March 1997, 500 series trainsets were introduced on Tokyo - Hakata Nozomi services, running at a maximum speed of 300 km/h and covering the section between Shin-Osaka and Hakata in 2 hours 17 minutes.

700 series trains were introduced on Nozomi services in 1999, and N700 series trains were introduced from July 1, 2007, initially with four daily round-trip runs. All regularly scheduled through Nozomi services to the San'yō Shinkansen (Tokyo–Hakata) were operated by N700 series sets from 13 March 2010. From the start of the revised timetable on 17 March 2012, all regularly scheduled Nozomi services, including runs limited to the Tokaido Shinkansen, were operated by N700 series sets.

See also
 List of named passenger trains of Japan

References

 
 JR Timetable, March 2008 issue

Railway services introduced in 1992
Named Shinkansen trains